He Who Must Die is a 1957 French-Italian film directed by Jules Dassin. It is based on the novel Christ Recrucified (also published as The Greek Passion) by Nikos Kazantzakis. It was entered into the 1957 Cannes Film Festival.

Plot
In a Turkish-occupied Greek village shortly after World War I, villagers put on a Passion Play, with ordinary people taking the roles of Jesus, Peter, Judas, etc. Staging the play leads to them rebelling against their Turkish rulers in a way that mirrors Jesus's story.

Cast
Jean Servais as Photis
Carl Möhner as Lukas
Grégoire Aslan as Agha
Gert Fröbe as Patriarcheos
Teddy Bilis as Hadji Nikolis
René Lefèvre as Yannakos
Lucien Raimbourg as Kostandis
Melina Mercouri as Katerina
Roger Hanin as Pannagotaros
Pierre Vaneck as Manolios
Dimos Starenios as Ladas
Nicole Berger as Mariori
Maurice Ronet as Michelis
Fernand Ledoux as Grigoris
Joe Dassin as Benos

Reception
The film received a generally positive response. It was favorably reviewed in Time and The New Yorker, and received awards in communist eastern Europe (Dassin was well known for his left-wing views), and even some liberal Catholics praised it. Bosley Crowther for The New York Times described it as "brutally realistic", praising the "daring sort of candor and relentless driving" in the way it works out the logic of the plot, and he also praised all of the cast.

References

External links

1957 films
1957 drama films
Adaptations of works by Nikos Kazantzakis
French drama films
Italian drama films
1950s French-language films
French black-and-white films
Films directed by Jules Dassin
Films based on Greek novels
Films set in Greece
Films shot in Crete
1950s Italian films
1950s French films